Sikorsky Airport can refer to:

 Sikorsky Memorial Airport, public airport in Fairfield County, Connecticut, United States
 Igor Sikorsky Kyiv International Airport, international airport in Kyiv, Ukraine